Ma-Na is a compilation album first released on August 12, 2005 at Comiket 68 in Japan by Key Sounds Label bearing the catalog number KSLA-0018. The album contains one disc with four tracks remixed from background music from four of Key's visual novels: Kanon, Air, Planetarian: The Reverie of a Little Planet, and Clannad. The tracks on the album were composed, arranged, and produced by Jun Maeda, Shinji Orito, and Magome Togoshi.

Track listing

References

External links
Key Sounds Label's official website 

2005 remix albums
Remix albums by Japanese artists
Key Sounds Label